Roger Petit-Didier was a French bobsledder. He competed in the four-man event at the 1928 Winter Olympics.

References

External links
 

Year of birth missing
Year of death missing
French male bobsledders
Olympic bobsledders of France
Field hockey players at the 1928 Summer Olympics
Bobsledders at the 1928 Winter Olympics
Place of birth missing